Rudrani is the consort of Rudra  Or Shiva. Later many scholars started associating Rudrani with Parvati, consort of Shiva.

References

Vedic period
Hindu goddesses
Forms of Parvati